Fionn Whitehead (born 18 July 1997) is an English actor. He portrayed the lead role in the 2017 film Dunkirk and the 2018 film Black Mirror: Bandersnatch. His first acting credit was in the 2016 ITV miniseries Him.

Life
Whitehead was born on  1997. He was born in Richmond, London, to jazz musicians Tim and Linda Whitehead. He was named after Irish folk legend Fionn mac Cumhaill. Whitehead has two older 2 sisters, Maisie, a performance artist and Hattie, a singer, and one older brother, Sonny. Whitehead was raised "in an artistic household". Growing up, he aspired to be either a guitarist or a breakdancer. He began acting at the Orange Tree Theatre when he was 13 years old. Later he went to Orleans Park School. He then went to Richmond College and entered the National Youth Theatre's summer course. By 2015, he was an aspiring actor working at a coffee shop in Waterloo, London.

Career

In 2016, Whitehead starred in the British miniseries Him. He also acted in a stage performance of Glenn Waldron's Natives.

He was cast as the protagonist of Christopher Nolan's film Dunkirk, which was released in 2017.  Nolan compared Whitehead to actor Tom Courtenay in his youth. Weeks after Whitehead finished with Dunkirk, he began work with Richard Eyre's film The Children Act, opposite Emma Thompson and Stanley Tucci, which premiered at the Toronto International Film Festival in September 2017. He also starred in one of eight monologues in the television series Queers that aired in 2017.

In 2018, Whitehead starred in the Black Mirror television series’ interactive stand-alone film Bandersnatch, as lead character Stefan Butler. In 2019, Whitehead appeared in Sebastian Schipper's drama Roads, and the Martin Scorsese produced Port Authority. He later appeared in The Duke and Don’t Tell a Soul (both 2020). He co-stars as Branwell Bronte in the Emily Bronte biopic Emily, and in a television adaptation of Great Expectations, playing the lead role of Pip.

Filmography

Accolades

References

External links
 

1997 births
Living people
21st-century English male actors
Alumni of Richmond upon Thames College
English male film actors
English male stage actors
English male television actors
Male actors from London
National Youth Theatre members
People educated at Orleans Park School
People from Richmond, London